William Cleland may refer to:
 William Cleland (poet) (c. 1661–1689), Scottish poet and soldier
 William Cleland (surgeon) (1912–2005), Australian-born British cardiothoracic surgeon
 W. Wallace Cleland (1930–2013), American professor of biochemistry
 W. L. Cleland (William Lennox Cleland, 1847–1918), medical doctor in South Australia